Countess Marisa Allasio (born Maria Luisa Lucia Allasio; 14 July 1934) is a retired Italian actress of the 1950s. She appeared in nearly 20 films between 1952 and 1957.

She was considered a typical sex symbol during her film career, which she abandoned in 1957, after marrying Count Pier Francesco Calvi di Bergolo (born 22 December 1932, died 2012), son of Princess Iolanda di Savoia, first-born of Vittorio Emanuele III and Elena del Montenegro.
They had two children, Carlo Giorgio Dmitri Drago Maria Laetitia dei Conti Calvi di Bergolo (born 1959, Rome) and Anda Federica Angelica Maria dei Conti Calvi di Bergolo (born 1962, Rome).

Filmography
Perdonami!, Mario Costa (1952)
Gli eroi della domenica, Mario Camerini (1953)
Cuore di mamma, Luigi Capuano (1954)
 Tragic Ballad, Luigi Capuano (1954)
Ragazze d'oggi, Luigi Zampa (1955)
Le diciottenni, Mario Mattoli (1955)
War and Peace, King Vidor (1956)
Maruzzella, Luigi Capuano (1956)
Poveri ma belli, Dino Risi (1957)
, Mauro Bolognini (1957)
Camping, Franco Zeffirelli (1957)
Belle ma povere, Dino Risi (1957)
Le schiave di Cartagine, Guido Brignone (1957)
Susanna tutta panna, Steno (1957)
Venezia, la luna e tu, Dino Risi (1958)
 (Nudi come Dio li creò), Hans Schott-Schöbinger (1958)
Carmela è una bambola, Gianni Puccini (1958)
Seven Hills of Rome (Italian title: Arrivederci Roma), Roy Rowland (1958)

References

External links

 

Allasio, Marisa 
Living people
Italian film actresses
Actors from Turin